Route 317 is a provincial highway in the Papineau County of the Outaouais region east of Gatineau, Quebec. The 36-kilometer highway connects Thurso, at the junction of Route 148, to Ripon at the junction of Route 321. It is also a link to Montpellier in which a rural route connects both the 315 and 317 towards the village.

Municipalities along Route 317
 Thurso
 Lochaber
 Saint-Sixte
 Ripon

Major intersections

See also
 List of Quebec provincial highways

References

External links 
 Official Transports Quebec Map 
 Route 317 on Google Maps

317